The 2004 BA-CA-TennisTrophy was a tennis tournament played on indoor hard courts. It was the 30th edition of the event known that year as the BA-CA-TennisTrophy, and was part of the International Series Gold of the 2004 ATP Tour. It took place at the Wiener Stadthalle in Vienna, Austria, from 11 October through 17 October 2004.

Finals

Singles

 Feliciano López defeated  Guillermo Cañas 6–4, 1–6, 7–5, 3–6, 7–5

Doubles

 Martin Damm /  Cyril Suk defeated  Gastón Etlis /  Martín Rodríguez 6–7(4–7), 6–4, 7–6(7–4)

References

External links
 Official website
 ATP tournament profile

BA-CA-TennisTrophy
Vienna Open
2004 in Austrian tennis